The Beggar Queen (1984) is a fantasy novel by American writer Lloyd Alexander, the concluding book of a series often called the Westmark trilogy.

The series has been called "historical fantasy, set in a time much like our 18th century". Another review has called Westmark of the second volume "an imaginary kingdom with a post-Napoleonic cast".

Plot introduction

Mickle, once a common street urchin, is now the queen of Westmark. The kingdom is thriving, yet at the same time, it is strangely restless. Ghosts of the past lurk everywhere. The evil minister, Cabbarus, once banished from Westmark, is now plotting to seize the throne. Theo remembers a time when he was the famed Kestrel, fighting battles that threatened to kill his soul. Now he once again must join in the struggle. Who will at last command the fate of Westmark?

One answer to that question is the people. The common people, mostly anonymous, rise up at the end, making the final overthrow of Cabbarus possible.

The book raises moral questions, especially about choices, the effects of having power, and the evil that seems necessary to prosecute a war. Theo tries to keep out of the battles in the book, but finds that he can not. He vows to kill Cabbarus. (Theo had once saved his life in Westmark, the first of the trilogy.)

In the end, many of the characters are dead, including Cabbarus, but not by the hand of Theo. A government, led by a council of commoners, begins to rise. Mickle, in one of her last acts as queen, proclaims that she and Theo are married. She sees that the two of them cannot remain in the country where she was queen. As the book ends, the couple leaves to travel the world together with their old friends, Las Bombas and Musket.

References 

1984 American novels
Novels by Lloyd Alexander
Westmark Trilogy
American children's novels
1984 children's books